Plumbley is a hamlet in South Yorkshire, England.

Plumbley may also refer to:

 Mark Plumbley (fl. 2015), a British engineer
 Catherine Plumbley, an Atlantic 21-class lifeboat

See also
 Plumley (disambiguation)
 Pumbley Cove